A. K. Blakemore (born in 1991) is an English author, poet, and translator.

Life and career
Blakemore was born in London in 1991. She studied Language and Literature at the University of Oxford. She has published two full-length collections of poetry, a novel, and a poet's manifesto, alongside translating the work of Sichuanese poet Yu Yoyo and contributing to various literary publications and collections.

Awards and recognition 
Aged 15, she had her poem Peckham Rye Lane published in the London Evening Standard. Blakemore was Foyle Young Poet of the Year in 2007 and 2008. She was awarded the 2014 Melita Hume Prize which resulted in her publishing her first full-length collection of poetry Humbert Summer. In 2017, The Poetry Society invited her to write a 'poetry manifesto', which she named "The flower is forever my capitain". She appeared at the Greenbelt Festival in 2018. Her second poetry collection, Fondue, was awarded the 2019 Ledbury Forte Prize. Blakemore's debut novel The Manningtree Witches won the 2021 Desmond Elliott Prize.

Books 
The Manningtree Witches (2021)

Blakemore's first novel is a fictional account of the Essex witch trials published by Granta Books (UK) and Catapult (US). It has been positively reviewed in The Guardian, and was the winner of the Desmond Elliott Prize 2021.

My Tenantless Body (2019)

Blakemore translated Sichuanese poet Yu Yoyo's collection of poetry in collaboration with Dave Haysom. This collection was published by the Poetry Translation Centre as part of their World Poets Series.

Fondue (2018)

A full-length collection of poetry, published by Offord Road Books and awarded the 2019 Ledbury Forte Prize for Best Second Collection.

pro ana (2016)

Poetry collection published by If a Leaf Falls Press.

Humbert Summer (2015)

This full-length collection of poetry, published by Eyewear Publishing after she won the 2014 Melita Hume Prize. She was interviewed on Lunar Poetry Podcast about this collection, reading five of the poems.

Amy's Intro (2012)

Poetry collection by Nasty Little Press.

Articles and anthologies 
Blakemore has written for and been featured in various literary publications including: The White Review, the Poetry Foundation, Partisan Hotel, Ambit, the Poetry Society, and Poetry London.

Her work has been anthologised in Bloodaxe Books' Voice Recognition; 21 Poets for the 21st Century, UEA Publishing Project's Stop/Sharpening/Your/Knives, and Salt Publishing's The Best of British Poetry 2015.

References

External links 
 @akblakemore on Twitter

Living people
21st-century English poets
1991 births
Recipients of Desmond Elliott Prize